League 6 of the MŽRKL, or Superleague, took place between 28 December 2015 and it will end on 11 February 2016.

The four best ranked teams advanced to the Final Four. The points against teams from the same preliminary round were taken over.

Standings

Fixtures and results
All times given below are in Central European Time.

Game 1

Game 2

Game 3

Game 4

Game 5

Game 6

External links
Official website
MŽRKL 2015–16 League 6 at srbijasport.net

League 6
2015–16 in Serbian basketball
2015–16 in Bosnia and Herzegovina basketball
2015–16 in Montenegrin basketball
2015–16 in Croatian basketball
2015–16 in Slovenian basketball